Mihai Mircea Gabel (23 July 1954 – 5 January 1996) was a Romanian footballer who played as a central midfielder.

References

1954 births
1996 deaths
Romanian footballers
Romania under-21 international footballers
Association football midfielders
Liga I players
Liga II players
Liga III players
FC Petrolul Ploiești players
CSM Reșița players
CSO Plopeni players
Sportspeople from Sibiu
Transylvanian Saxon people